Alan Gerald Sieroty (born 13 December 1930) is an American politician and attorney who served as a member of both chambers of the California State Legislature.

Early life and education 
Born in Los Angeles, California, Sieroty was the son of retail store chain executive Julian M. Sieroty and the grandson of Adolph Sieroty, the downtown Los Angeles merchant who built the historic Eastern Columbia Building.  His mother was Jean Sieroty, an immigrant from Poland who became a philanthropist and activist.  He graduated from Beverly Hills High School, then received his A.B. in Economics in 1952 from Stanford University, where he was a member of the Phi Beta Kappa Society. He then received his LL.B. from USC Gould School of Law in 1956.  Sieroty is Jewish.

Career 
From 1961 to 1965, he was Administrative Assistant and Executive Secretary to Lieutenant Governor Glenn M. Anderson. From 1965 to 1966, Sieroty was Deputy Director of the Chile-California Program.

A Democrat, Sieroty was a California State Assemblyman from 1967 until 1977, when he resigned just two months into his sixth term to become a California State Senator. He was re-elected in 1978 but did not seek re-election in 1982. Sieroty was the author of the bill which made the California Sabretooth Tiger (Smilodon californicus) the official state fossil. His fellow politicians in the Legislature named a Marin County beach for him, Alan Sieroty Beach.

He was Chairman of the Arts Task Force of the National Conference of State Legislatures and was also a member of the board of directors of the American Civil Liberties Union. In 1985, Sieroty became founding vice president of the California State Summer School for the Arts and has been a member of its board of trustees ever since.

References

External links
Join California Alan Sieroty

1930 births
Living people
Politicians from Los Angeles
Stanford University alumni
USC Gould School of Law alumni
Members of the California State Assembly
California state senators
20th-century American politicians